er 14, 2005) was an American cattle rancher, contractor and developer prominent in the state of Texas.

Lyda was reared in Burnet County at the edge of the Texas Hill Country in Central Texas. His grandfather was Gideon Paloris Lyda who worked as a foreman on Thomas Lyons & Angus Campbell's famous LC Ranch headquartered near Silver City, New Mexico.  Separated from his family at age 10 by his mother's death and the foreclosure on the family farm, Lyda worked for various ranches throughout the Texas Hill Country where he could be close to horses, cattle and ranching life.

During World War II, Lyda worked for the railroad, but soon became a carpenter with a large El Paso-based general contractor.  He worked with his tools on military projects throughout Texas, Utah and Colorado.  Returning to Texas between construction jobs, Lyda broke horses, worked as a ranch hand, occasionally competed in saddle bronc riding at small-town rodeos and learned the art of making saddles from legendary rodeo producer and businessman, T. C. "Buck" Steiner of Austin.

Lyda married Randa Jean Lyda and moved to Nixon, Texas to manage the Evans Ranch. To support his wife and two young boys, he quit working as a cowboy in 1947 and was hired on as a carpenter with Farnsworth & Chambers, a large building contractor with headquarters in Houston. With the support and encouragement of supervisor/mentor H. Alvin Lott, Lyda earned a reputation for being an innovative, cost-conscious project superintendent who could deliver projects on time and under budget.  In late 1954, the 31-year-old project superintendent was transferred to San Antonio to build the massive Wilford Hall Hospital project at Lackland Air Force Base.  After completing the hospital on time and within budget, he was promoted to Area Superintendent.

In 1960, he formed his own construction company, Darragh & Lyda, with Burnet County rancher Steinmetz Darragh.  In the mid-1960s, a joint venture between the San Antonio-based company and H. A. Lott Inc. built the Tower of the Americas and most of the major HemisFair '68 structures in San Antonio.

The Lyda organization grew to be one of the most successful general contractors in Texas.  Such projects as the Alamodome, the expansion of the University of Texas Memorial Stadium, the Hyatt Hill Country Resort Hotel, the San Antonio Convention Center, the Westin La Cantera Resort Hotel and the Fiesta Texas theme park, as well as hospitals, hotels, banks and office buildings, have significantly re-shaped the skylines of major Texas cities. The company and its subsidiaries were ranked among the Top 400 Contractors by Engineering News-Record and was consistently ranked among the Top 3 commercial building contractors based on billings in San Antonio by San Antonio Business Journal.  In 2003, Lyda sold Lyda Constructors Inc., the 100% owned subsidiary of Lyda Inc., to Swinerton, Inc. of San Francisco.

After the sale, Lyda retired to his beloved La Escalera Ranch, just south of Fort Stockton, Texas.  Lyda had owned or traded more than 880,000 acres (3600 km²) of ranch real estate by 1999, including the sprawling Ladder Ranch in southeastern New Mexico which Lyda eventually sold to television mogul Ted Turner and his actress wife Jane Fonda.  Lyda died  in 2005.  Today, sons Gerald D. and Gene Lyda, along with their sister Jo Granberg, manage the 220,000 deeded acre La Escalera Ranch, which spreads across four Texas counties: Reeves, Pecos, Brewster, Archer, and Baylor. La Escalera Ranch has been ranked by Texas Monthly, The Land Report, and Worth (magazine) as one of the largest cattle ranches in the United States.

References

 Lyda, Gerald.  No Hill Is Too Steep:  A Collection of Memories by Gerald Lyda – In His Own Words. (Hard Cover) Burke Publishing Company, 1999.  263 pp.
 Ward, Delbert R.  Great Ranches of the United States.  (Soft Cover)  Ganado Press, 1993, 242 pp.

External links
La Escalera Ranch – Official Website
Gerald Lyda – The Man Behind the Brand
Wilson County News – Obituary of Gerald D. Lyda Sr.
Tower of the Americas constructed by Lyda Inc. & H. A. Lott Inc.
– San Antonio, Texas – constructed by Lyda Constructors
San Antonio Business Journal – "Lyda Constructors Bought by Swinerton"
Worth magazine – February 1997 – Top 100 Largest Landowners in the U.S. – Gerald Lyda Sr. ranked #33
Interview with Gerald Lyda, February 18, 2000. University of Texas at San Antonio: Institute of Texan Cultures: Oral History Collection, UA 15.01, University of Texas at San Antonio Libraries Special Collections.
Lyons & Campbell Ranch Headquarters - A Brief History -https://www.lyonscampbellranch.com/history

1923 births
2005 deaths
American construction businesspeople
American cattlemen
Ranchers from Texas
People from San Antonio
People from the Texas Hill Country
People from Burnet County, Texas
Saddle bronc riders
People from Fort Stockton, Texas